140 Corps Engineer Regiment was a short-lived Territorial Army (TA) unit of the Royal Engineers based  in the North Midlands of England during the 1960s.

Organisation
The regiment was formed on 1 May 1961 from individual batteries of TA Royal Artillery regiments that were being broken up. Three of these batteries were transferred to the Royal Engineers (RE) and redesignated as squadrons, giving the regiment the following composition:

140 Corps Engineer Regiment
 Regimental Headquarters at Nottingham
 438 (Derbyshire Artillery) Field Squadron at Derby – former P (North Midland) Battery from 438 Light Anti-Aircraft Regiment, continuing the traditions of 4th North Midland Brigade, Royal Field Artillery
 575 (Sherwood Foresters) Field Squadron at Chesterfield – former 575 (Sherwood Foresters) Light Anti-Aircraft Regiment, continuing the traditions of 6th Battalion, Sherwood Foresters
 115 (Leicestershire) Field Park Squadron at Leicester – former R Battery from 350 (The Robin Hood Foresters) Light Regiment, continuing the traditions of the Leicestershire Royal Horse Artillery

Disbandment
140 Corps Engineer Rgt was disbanded in 1967 when the TA was reduced to the Territorial and Army Volunteer Reserve. RHQ was converted into RHQ for 73 Engineer Rgt at Nottingham, while elements of 438 and 575 Sqns went as infantry to the Derbyshire Battalion, Sherwood Foresters and 115 Sqn to the TAVR III contingent of the Leicestershire Regiment. In 1969 the Derbyshire Battalion was reduced to a cadre (later C (Derbyshire Foresters) Company in 3rd (Volunteer) Bn Worcestershire and Sherwood Foresters Regiment) and 575 (The Sherwood Foresters) Fd Sqn at Chesterfield and Derby was reformed in 73 Engineer Regiment.

575 Field Squadron was withdrawn from the army's order of battle under the 2020 Army Reserve structure changes and was disbanded in 2014, two troops and the Chesterfield TA Centre (Wallis Barracks) being transferred to 350 (Sherwood Foresters) Fd Sqn in 33 Engineer Regiment (EOD).

Notes

References
 Summary of Army 2020 Reserve Structure and Basing, Ministry of Defence, 2013.
 Norman E.H. Litchfield, The Territorial Artillery 1908–1988 (Their Lineage, Uniforms and Badges), Nottingham: Sherwood Press, 1992, .

External sources
 British Army units from 1945 on
 Land Forces of Britain, the Empire and Commonwealth – Regiments.org (archive site)

Regiments of the Royal Engineers
Military units and formations in Nottinghamshire
Military units and formations in Nottingham
Military units and formations established in 1961
Military units and formations disestablished in 1967